Zombie Terrorist is the first full-length album by Partyline, released on October 24, 2006 on Retard Disco.

Track listing
"Party-n-Animal" – 1:30
"Zombie Terrorist" – 1:44
"Casual Encounters" – 1:20
"Trophy Wifey" – 2:07
"No Romantic" – 1:22
"Ladies' Room" – 1:46
"Earthlings" – 1:49
"Nuthaus" – 2:08
"X-Hearts" – 1:50
"Partyline" (Government Issue cover) – 1:08
"Who Knows, Who Cares?" – 1:15

Personnel

Partyline
 Crystal Bradley, drums
 Angela Melkisethian, guitar
 Allison Wolfe, vocals

Contributing artists
Michael Cotterman provides bass guitar on all tracks; additional backing vocals were contributed by Hugh McElroy (formerly of Black Eyes) and Chris Paul Richards.

Album credits
Recorded May 26–28, 2006 at Inner Ear Studios.
Engineered by Don Zientara
Produced by Christopher Paul Richards, Don Zientara, and Partyline.
Mastered by Chad Clark at Silver Sonya.
"Partyline" is a Government Issue song.
All songs (except "Partyline") copyright/R/TM by Partyline 2006 and Baby Donut Music, Hussy Musk, Dixie Crystal (ASCAP).
Cover photo by Daisy Lacy
Inside photo by Stephen D. Melkisethian
Design by Hussy Musk/Angela

References

2006 albums